VHC may refer to:

Valley Hockey Club
Vavuniya Hindu College
Vida Heydari Contemporary
Volumetric heat capacity
Vonnegut Hardware Company
IATA code for Saurimo Airport